The Royal Gibraltar Police (RGP) is, along with His Majesty's Customs (Gibraltar), the principal civilian law enforcement agency in the British overseas territory of Gibraltar. It is the oldest police force in the Commonwealth of Nations outside the United Kingdom.

The Royal Gibraltar Police, previously the Gibraltar Police Force, was formed in 1830, only nine months after Sir Robert Peel founded the Metropolitan Police in London.  It was Peel who sent one of his officers to Gibraltar to form the Gibraltar Police Force.

The force was granted the "Royal" prefix by Queen Elizabeth II in 1992.

The force works with the Gibraltar Defence Police (GDP), His Majesty's Customs (Gibraltar), Border and Coastguard Agency (Gibraltar), HM Prison Service and the military Joint Provost and Security Unit.

Personnel strength and deployment
The force, referred to locally as the RGP, currently numbers over 220 officers, who are divided into a number of units. These include CID, Drug Squad, Special Branch, Firearms Unit, Scene of Crime Examiners, Traffic Department, Marine Section and the Operations Division.

From its inception, up until 1999 when St. John Ambulance Brigade took over, the Gibraltar Police provided the territory's only emergency ambulance service, using officers seconded from the Operations Division. The RGP also acted as immigration officers at all entry points until the early 1990s.

The current headquarters is at New Mole House Police Station, Rosia Road. The Previous HQ used to be at 120 Irish Town. There are plans to turn this into a Police Museum. There is a sub-station at Casemates Square.

Uniform
In general the uniformed officers of the Gibraltar force follow British police models in their dress. On foot patrol, male constables and sergeants, like their counterparts in England and Wales, Jersey, Guernsey, the Isle of Man and Bermuda, wear the traditional headgear of the "bobby on the beat", correctly known as the "custodian helmet", which is similar to some Army helmets and was adopted by the Metropolitan Police in London in 1863 to replace the top hat formerly worn, other forces then following suit. The helmet is traditionally made of cork covered outside by felt or serge-like material that matches the tunic.

As in many police forces in England and Wales, the Brunswick star is used as the basis for the force badge, with a central device representing Gibraltar. The badge appears also as the helmet plate.

Rank structure
The RGP rank structure follows the usual UK police pattern, but with fewer ranks. The chief police officer is known as the Commissioner The RGP ranks consist of:

RGP Marine Section
The Royal Gibraltar Police force have a marine section located in the Royal Navy Base, This facility is jointly used with the Gibraltar Defence Police Marine Section. Since 2012 there have been many new additions to the unit including jet skis and larger vessels.

The role of the RGP Marine Section is to enforce the law in British Gibraltar Territorial Waters and this often includes co-operation with other local and international agencies. The RGP Marine Section plays a vital role in anti-drug smuggling operations for the local area.

Vessels of the Royal Gibraltar Police Marine Section: 
Sir William Jackson
Sir Joshua Hassan
Sir Francis Richards
Sir John Chapple

Chief of Police 1830 to 1937. As from 1937 Commissioner of Police

Equipment
RGP officers employ a wide variety of equipment for police work, such as motor vehicles, sea vessels, arrest equipment and radios.
Vehicles carry the UK police 'battenburg' style livery, with blue flashing lights and sirens. Unlike the UK, however, these are left hand drive vehicles, as traffic in Gibraltar drives on the right.

Gallery

See also
 Gibraltar Defence Police
 His Majesty's Customs (Gibraltar)
 Border and Coastguard Agency (Gibraltar)
 Law of Gibraltar

References

External links
 Royal Gibraltar Police official website

Gibraltar
Law enforcement agencies of Gibraltar
Organizations with royal patronage
Government agencies established in 1830
19th-century establishments in Gibraltar
1830 establishments in Gibraltar